Ringo Starr & His All-Starr Band is a live rock supergroup founded in 1989 with shifting personnel, led by former Beatles drummer and vocalist Ringo Starr.

History and description
Since 1989, Starr has toured with fourteen variations of the band, where "everybody on stage is a star in their own right". Ringo Starr and his All-Starr Band is a concept that was created by producer David Fishof.

The band has consistently toured for over three decades, and rotates its line-up depending on availability of musicians and at Starr's discretion. All-Starr Band shows generally feature 10–12 songs sung by Starr, including those he performed with The Beatles and in his solo career. Mixed with Starr's songs are those performed by the All-Starrs (usually 2–3 per person), generally the biggest hits from their respective groups or solo careers.

The All-Starr Band does not compose original music, but a number of live albums featuring the group have been released. The sole exception is the track "Island in the Sun", off Starr's 2015 album Postcards from Paradise, which was co-written and performed by Starr and every member of that year's All-Starr Band.

Current members
 the band lineup includes the following members:
 Ringo Starr – vocals, drums, piano (1989–present)
 Colin Hay – guitar, harmonica, vocals (2003, 2008, 2018–present)
 Hamish Stuart – bass, guitar, vocals (2006–2008, 2019–present)
 Edgar Winter – keyboards, saxophone, percussion, vocals (2006–2011, 2022–present)
 Gregg Bissonette – drums, percussion, trumpet, backing vocals (2008–present)
 Steve Lukather – guitars, bass, vocals (2012–present)
 Warren Ham – saxophone, percussion, keyboards, harmonica, vocals (2014–present)

Former members 
 Joe Walsh – guitar, piano, keyboards, talkbox, vocals (1989–1992; occasional guest 1995-2019)
 Nils Lofgren – guitar, accordion, vocals (1989–1992; occasional guest 1995-2019)
 Dr. John – piano, bass, vocals (1989; guest 2008; died 2019)
 Billy Preston – keyboards, vocals (1989, 1995; died 2006)
 Rick Danko – bass, guitar, vocals (1989; died 1999)
 Levon Helm – drums, harmonica, vocals (1989; guest 2008; died 2012)
 Clarence Clemons – saxophone, tambourine, percussion, vocals (1989; died 2011)
 Jim Keltner – drums (1989; occasional guest 2006-2019)
 Todd Rundgren – guitar, harmonica keyboards, drums, percussion, tambourine, bass, vocals (1992, 1999, 2012–2017)
 Dave Edmunds – guitar, vocals (1992, 2000)
 Burton Cummings – keyboards, guitar, tambourine, harmonica, flute, vocals (1992)
 Timothy B. Schmit – bass, guitar, vocals (1992; guest 1997)
 Zak Starkey – drums (1992–1995; occasional guest 1989-2010)
 Timmy Cappello – saxophone, percussion, keyboards, harmonica, vocals (1992, 1999)
 Randy Bachman – guitar, vocals (1995)
 Mark Farner – guitar, harmonica, vocals (1995; guest 1997)
 Felix Cavaliere – organ, keyboards, percussion, vocals (1995; guest 2012)
 John Entwistle – bass, vocals (1995; died 2002)
 Mark Rivera – saxophone, percussion, organ, keyboards, guitar, bass, harmonica, vocals (1995-1998, 2000–2003, 2011–2013; occasional guest 2010-2019)
 Peter Frampton – guitar, talk box, vocals (1997-1998; guest 2012)
 Gary Brooker – keyboards, organ, vocals (1997-1999; guest 2010; died 2022)
 Jack Bruce – bass, keyboards, guitar, vocals (1997-2000; guest 2010; died 2014)
 Simon Kirke – drums, vocals (1997-2000; guest 2003)
 Scott Gordon – harmonica (1998)
 Eric Carmen – keyboards, guitar, bass, vocals (2000; occasional guest 1989-2019)
 Roger Hodgson – guitar, keyboards, vocals (2001)
 Ian Hunter – guitar, keyboards, vocals (2001)
 Howard Jones – keyboards, vocals (2001)
 Greg Lake – bass, acoustic guitar, vocals (2001; died 2016)
 Sheila E. – drums, vocals (2001-2006; guest 2008)
 Paul Carrack – keyboards, guitar, vocals (2003)
 John Waite – bass, guitar, vocals (2003)
 Billy Squier – guitar, bass, vocals (2006, 2008; occasional guest 2010-2014)
 Richard Marx – guitar, keyboards, vocals (2006; occasional guest 2010-2012)
 Rod Argent – organ, keyboards, vocals (2006)
 Gary Wright – keyboards, vocals (2008-2011; guest 2012)
 Wally Palmar – guitar, harmonica, vocals (2010; guest 2019)
 Rick Derringer – guitar, vocals (2010)
 Richard Page – bass, acoustic guitar, vocals (2010-2017; guest 2019)
 Gregg Rolie – organ, keyboards, vocals (2012-2021)
 Graham Gouldman – bass, guitar, vocals (2018)

Notable guests 
 Bruce Springsteen – guitar, vocals (1989)
 John Candy – tambourine (1989; died 1994)
 Garth Hudson – accordion (1989)
 Paul Shaffer (1989)
 James Gang (1992)
 Slash (1995)
 Stevie Nicks (1995)
 Ginger Baker – drums (1997-1998, 1999; died 2019)
 Andy Summers – guitar (1999, 2000)
 Michael McDonald - vocals (2000)
 Steven Van Zandt – vocals (2003. 2006, 2012, 2014)
 Pete Townshend – vocals (2006)
 Jeff Lynne - vocals (2006, 2010) 
 Paul McCartney – bass, vocals (2010)
 Pat Mastelotto – drums (2013)
 Klaus Voormann – backing vocals (2018)

Tours and members

Timeline

Discography

Live albums

Compilation albums
 The Anthology... So Far  (2001)
 Extended Versions (2003)
 Ringo Starr and Friends (2006)

Singles

As featured artist

Video albums

Typical setlists

1989

1992

1995

1997–1998

1999

2000

2001

2003

2006

2008

2010–2011

2012–2017

2018

2019

2022

Ringo's songs
This table shows when particular songs were included in the setlist:

All Starr songs
This table shows when particular All Starr members' songs were included in the setlist, not including solo spots:

References

 
All-Starr Band
Musical groups established in 1989
English rock music groups
Musical groups from London
Todd Rundgren
Rock music supergroups